HMS Nunney Castle was a  ordered by the British Royal Navy during the Second World War. The ship was transferred to the Royal Canadian Navy before completion and renamed HMCS Bowmanville. Bowmanville served with the Royal Canadian Navy in the final years of the war and was sold for mercantile use in 1946. Renamed Ta Shun, the ship sailed under a Chinese flag, later being renamed Yuan Pei. In 1949, the former corvette was taken over by the Communist-controlled government of China and rearmed and renamed Kuang Chou. Kuang Chou was listed until 1976 and was stricken in 1986.

Design and description
The Castle class were an improved corvette design over their predecessor . The Flower class was not considered acceptable for mid-Atlantic sailing and was only used on Atlantic convoy duty out of need. Though the Admiralty would have preferred s, the inability of many small shipyards to construct the larger ships required them to come up with a smaller vessel. The increased length of the Castle class over their predecessors and their improved hull form gave the Castles better speed and performance on patrol in the North Atlantic and an acceptable replacement for the Flowers. This, coupled with improved anti-submarine armament in the form of the Squid mortar led to a much more capable anti-submarine warfare (ASW) vessel. However, the design did have criticisms, mainly in the way it handled at low speeds and that the class's maximum speed was already slower than the speeds of the new U-boats they would be facing.

The ships had a complement of 120.

The ships were powered by two Admiralty three-drum boilers which created .

The corvettes were armed with one QF 4-inch Mk XIX gun mounted forward. Anti-air armament varied from 4 to 10 Oerlikon 20 mm cannons. For ASW purposes, the ships were equipped with one three-barreled Squid anti-submarine mortar with 81 projectiles. The ships also had two depth charge throwers and one depth charge rail on the stern that came with 15 depth charges.

The ships were equipped with Type 145 and Type 147B ASDIC. The Type 147B was tied to the Squid anti-submarine mortar and would automatically set the depth on the fuses of the projectiles until the moment of firing. A single Squid-launched attack had a success rate of 25%. The class was also provided with HF/DF and Type 277 radar.

Construction and career
Nunney Castle was ordered on 23 January 1943 from William Pickersgill & Sons Ltd of Sunderland. Like all ships of the class, the vessel was named after a castle in the United Kingdom, Nunney Castle in Somerset and awarded the pennant number K446. The ship was laid down on 12 August 1943 and launched on 26 January 1944. At some point in 1943, the ship was formally transferred to the Royal Canadian Navy. The corvette was commissioned into the Royal Canadian Navy on 28 September 1944 with the pennant number K493. The ship was named after Bowmanville, a town in southern Ontario.

After commissioning, Bowmanville worked up at Tobermory before joining the Mid-Ocean Escort Force escort group C-4 for convoy escort duty. The corvette served as convoy escort for the rest of the war. In June 1945, Bowmanville returned to Canada and was based out of Halifax until being paid off on 15 January 1946.

Bowmanville was sold for mercantile use on 5 September 1946 and served under a Nationalist Chinese flag initially as Ta Shun, then later as Yuan Pei. In 1949, Yuan Pei was taken over by the Communist Chinese government after the Nationalists abandoned mainland China. The vessel was rearmed with two single  guns, one  gun and five single  guns. The ship was renamed Kuang Chou and was listed as being in service until 1976, and stricken in 1986.

References

Notes

Citations

References
 
 
 
 
 
 

 

Ships of the Royal Canadian Navy
Castle-class corvettes
Corvettes of the People's Liberation Army Navy
1944 ships